The Three Sisters Wilderness is a wilderness area in the Cascade Range, within the Willamette and Deschutes National Forests in Oregon, United States. It comprises , making it the second largest wilderness area in Oregon, after the Eagle Cap Wilderness. It was established by the United States Congress in 1964 and is named for the Three Sisters volcanoes. The wilderness boundary encloses the Three Sisters as well as Broken Top, which is southeast of South Sister.

Three Sisters was designated as a UNESCO Biosphere Reserve under the Man and the Biosphere Programme in 1976, and was one of 17 reserves in the United States withdrawn from the programme in June 2017.

Oregon Route 242 separates the Three Sisters Wilderness from the Mount Washington Wilderness to the north, while the Waldo Lake Wilderness shares the southern boundary.

The three peaks were known by pioneers as Faith, Hope and Charity. Nearby landmarks include The Husband, The Wife, and the Little Brother.

Geology
Many types of landforms make up the wilderness area, but the most common are volcanic features, the most notable being the Cascades which are stratovolcanoes having formed around 1.6 million years ago. Numerous cinder cones have formed on their flanks as well as many lava flows that contain hundreds of lava tubes.

Topography
Including Broken Top—just to the south at  — there are 14 glaciers offering one of the best examples of the effects of glaciation in the Pacific Northwest. Collier Glacier, between North and Middle Sister, is the largest glacier in Oregon. The headwaters of the Wild and Scenic Whychus Creek (formerly Squaw Creek) emerge in the Wilderness.

Vegetation
Forest cover in the Three Sisters Wilderness includes Douglas fir, Pacific silver fir, subalpine fir, mountain hemlock, western hemlock, lodgepole pine and ponderosa pine. A large area of the Wilderness above timberline contains alpine meadows.

Recreation

Popular recreational activities in the Three Sisters Wilderness include camping, hiking, climbing and fishing. South Sister and Middle Sister are not technically difficult climbs, but summiting North Sister requires technical expertise and equipment. The  French Pete Trail and its surrounding old-growth forest, a nationwide political issue in the 1970s, are located on the western edge of the wilderness near Cougar Reservoir.

See also

 List of Oregon Wildernesses
 List of U.S. Wilderness Areas
 Wilderness Act

References

External links 

 Three Sisters Wilderness - Willamette National Forest
 Three Sisters Wilderness - Deschutes National Forest
 Wilderness.net Wilderness information
 TopoQuest map of the Three Sisters

Former biosphere reserves of the United States
Protected areas of Deschutes County, Oregon
IUCN Category Ib
Protected areas of Lane County, Oregon
Wilderness areas of Oregon
Willamette National Forest
Deschutes National Forest
1964 establishments in Oregon
Protected areas established in 1964